VA-146 may refer to:
 Attack Squadron 146 (U.S. Navy)
 State Route 146 (Virginia)